Elizabeth Quaile (January 20, 1874 – June 30, 1951) was an American piano pedagogue of Irish birth.

A native of Omagh, Quaile emigrated to the United States early in her life; she settled in New York City, and undertook studies with Franklin Robinson before turning to teaching. From 1916 until 1919 she chaired the piano department of the David Mannes School; she then traveled to Paris for more study, taking lessons with Harold Bauer. In 1921 she returned to New York, founding the Diller-Quaile School of Music with Angela Diller that same year. Quaile, sometimes together with Diller, produced a number of books and other works to be used in the teaching of piano, many of which saw much success.

References

1874 births
1951 deaths
Piano pedagogues
American music educators
American women music educators
People from Omagh
Irish emigrants to the United States (before 1923)
Mannes College The New School for Music faculty
20th-century American educators
20th-century American women educators
American women academics